Yamrach is a village in Qaimoh block in Kulgam district of Jammu and Kashmir.It is located at 13 km from Kulgam.

Demographics 
According to the 2011 census, it has a population of 2000 of which 1100 are male and 900 are female. The whole population practices Islam. Kashmiri, Urdu, English, Arabic and Hindi are spoken there.

Geography 
This village is bordered by Katapora to the east, Hangulbuch to the northeast, Hatipora and Tungdonu to the north, Hanger to the west, Dasen to the south and Khanpora to the southeast. The road through Yamrach connects Yaripora with Hanger.

Culture 
Cricket is popular.

Education 
Four schools are there:

 Shinning Public School
 Hanfia Middle School
 Govt. Middle School 
 Govt.SSA School

Healthcare 
The health facility is Sub Centre Yamrach.

See also
 Yaripora

References 

Villages in Kulgam district